Giulio della Rovere, also known as Giulio Feltrio della Rovere (5 April 1533 – 3 September 1578) was an Italian Cardinal of the Catholic Church and a member of the della Rovere family.

Della Rovere was the second son of Francesco Maria I della Rovere and Eleonora Gonzaga and the younger brother of Guidobaldo II della Rovere, Duke of Urbino.

Della Rovere was elevated to cardinal in 1548 at the age of 13. 

He had two illegitimate sons: Ippolito and Giuliano. Both were later legitimised, as were their children, by Pope Pius V in 1572 and Ippolito was made Marchese di San Lorenzo.

Episcopal succession
While bishop, he was the principal consecrator of principal consecrator of:
Giovanni Oliva, Archbishop of Chieti (1568); and 
Alessandro Mazza, Bishop of Fossombrone (1569).

References and notes

Sources
Dennistoun, James (1851). Memoirs of the Dukes of Urbino. Vol. III. London: Longman, Brown, Green & Longmans 1851, pp. 76-77. 
Sanfilippo, Matteo (1989). "Della Rovere, Giulio Feltrio." .  In: Dizionario Biografico degli Italiani Volume 37 (1989).
Ligi, B. (1953). I vescovi e arcivescovi di Urbino. . Urbino 1953, pp. 145-52.
 

1533 births
1578 deaths
16th-century Italian cardinals
Giulio
Cardinal-nephews